Pavel Grigoryevich Ponedelin (4 March 1893  Moscow 25 August 1950) was a Soviet general executed after World War II for being taken prisoner by the Germans.

Early life 
He fought in World War I in the Imperial Russian Army before going over to the Bolsheviks.
During the Russian Civil War, he fought against the Poles and was wounded. In the following years he commanded a regiment and then a brigade. In 1926 he graduated from the Frunze Military Academy in Moscow. In 1938 he was promoted to Kombrig and became chief of staff of the 1st Rifle Corps. In 1939-1940, he participated in the Winter War. Due to the defeat of his troops, he was moved to command the 139th Rifle Division. In 1940, he was appointed Major General major and from July that year, he was the chief of staff of the Leningrad Military District.

World War II and death 
In March 1941, he became commander of the 12th Army of the Kiev Special Military District, which he still commanded at the start of Soviet-German War.

In early August, during the Battle of Uman, his army was decisively beaten and together with General Nikolai Kirillov, he was captured by the Germans. For this, he was sentenced to death by Stalin in Order No. 270. He remained in a German POW camp until late April 1945, when he was liberated by the Americans, and handed over to the Soviets. At the end of December that year he was arrested and imprisoned in the Lefortovo Prison in Moscow.

On 25 August 1950, after a trial, he was sentenced to death and shot the same day. He was rehabilitated in 1956.

References 

1893 births
1950 deaths
People from Ivanovo Oblast
People from Yuryevetsky Uyezd
Soviet major generals
Imperial Russian Army officers
Frunze Military Academy alumni
Russian military personnel of World War I
Soviet military personnel of the Russian Civil War
People of the Polish–Soviet War
Soviet military personnel of the Winter War
Soviet military personnel of World War II
Recipients of the Order of Lenin
Recipients of the Order of the Red Banner
Russian people executed by the Soviet Union
Soviet rehabilitations